Wierzbno  is a village in the administrative district of Gmina Otmuchów, within Nysa County, Opole Voivodeship, in south-western Poland, close to the Czech border.

The village has a population of 360.

The name of the village is of Polish origin and comes from the word wierzba, which means "willow".

References

Wierzbno